This is a catalogue of all songs by Fightstar. For more information see their discography.

Fightstar